The 2014–15 season was Swindon Town's third consecutive season in the League One since gaining promotion from League Two in 2012. Swindon were seeking to better the 2013–14 season, a campaign that resulted in the Wiltshire club narrowly missing out on a spot in the play-offs.

Alongside the league campaign, Swindon Town also competed in the FA Cup, League Cup and the Football League Trophy.

Chronological list of events

April (2014)
17 April 2014: Jose Antonio wins the annual Samsung Win a Pro Contact competition. The one-year deal is scheduled to begin in the Summer of 2014.
26 April 2014: Youth graduates Matty Jones and Curtis Da Costa are offered professional contracts.
28 April 2014: Local press in Gloucestershire link Swindon to Forest Green Rovers and England C defender, Jamie Turley.

May (2014)
3 May 2014: It is announced that senior players Dany N'Guessan, Alex Smith, Lee Cox, Jay McEveley and Paul Benson will not be offered new contracts.
3 May 2014: Development players Aaron Oakley, Kayden Jackson, Leigh Bedwell, Mark Francis and Alex Ferguson are also released by the club.
7 May 2014: Miles Storey is reported to have attracted interest from fellow League One side Notts County and League Two sides Shrewsbury Town and Portsmouth.
14 May 2014: Australia Head Coach Ange Postecoglou names Town midfielder Massimo Luongo within his 30-man provisional squad ahead of the 2014 FIFA World Cup Finals in Brazil.
16 May 2014: A scheduled courtroom hearing between lawyers representing club owners Swinton Reds Ltd and the previous owners Seebeck 87 Ltd is postponed.
22 May 2014: It is announced that Swindon Town's sponsorship deal with Samsung has ended after three seasons.
27 May 2014: Massimo Luongo survives the first cut as the Australia squad for the World Cup is reduced from 30 to 27 players.
28 May 2014: It is belatedly reported that Swindon Town had been interested in signing ex-England defender Nicky Shorey before he signed a new deal with Portsmouth.
30 May 2014: The club release a statement announcing that the ownership dispute between Swinton Reds Ltd and Seebeck 87 Ltd will be decided in the High Court on 26 June 2014.

June
3 June 2014: Massimo Luongo is named in the final 23-man Australia squad for the 2014 FIFA World Cup. Luongo becomes the first footballer since Jan Åge Fjørtoft in 1994 to represent Swindon Town at the World Cup Finals.
13 June 2014: It is confirmed that Jack Barthram and Connor Waldon have signed contract extensions and will remain with the club.
14 June 2014: Reports suggest that out-of-contract Town defender Troy Archibald-Henville has been offered to other clubs by his representatives while contract negotiations continue.
17 June 2014: The Swindon Advertiser report that Swindon Town are close to agreeing a new three-year sponsorship deal worth around £250,000 with locally based company, Imagine Cruising.
19 June 2014: Imagine Cruising are officially announced as the club's new kit sponsor.
24 June 2014: Portsmouth are reported to be on the brink of signing young Town forward Miles Storey on loan until the end of the 2014/15 season.
25 June 2014: High Court proceedings to determine the ownership of Swindon Town F.C. begins.
26 June 2014: The second day of High Court proceedings closes with Judge Nicholas Strauss QC unable to reach a verdict.
26 June 2014: The Swindon Advertiser report that Tyrell Belford has been made available for loan.
27 June 2014: Steve Hale is appointed Head of Goalkeeping.

July
1 July 2014: Swindon Town's ownership battle has been settled after a High Court Judge Nicholas Strauss QC ruled that chairman Lee Power's takeover was carried out properly while former owner Jed McCrory is ordered to pay legal costs likely to total over £50,000. Lee Power reacts to the decision by calling the former owners, 'rogues'.
3 July 2014: Swindon Town chairman Lee Power writes an open letter apologising for the recent trials and tribulations that the club had experienced.
8 July 2014: Chairman Lee Power confirms during a BBC Radio Wiltshire phone-in that Swindon Town are looking to bring Southampton defender Jack Stephens back to Wiltshire.
9 July 2014: Town defender Nathan Thompson is linked as a possible transfer target for fellow League One side Peterborough United.
11 July 2014: Manager Mark Cooper admits that Darren Ward and midfielder Ryan Harley are not in his future plans.
14 July 2014: It is reported that young Liverpool left-back Brad Smith is a loan transfer target for Swindon Town.
15 July 2014: The BBC report that Swindon have rejected a £600,000 bid from Rotherham United for Massimo Luongo.
15 July 2014: Scott Lindsey is appointed the new manager of the Under-18's side.
16 July 2014: A tentative £200,000 bid by Peterborough United for Town captain Nathan Thompson is rejected.
16 July 2014: Ibrahim Kargbo is banned indefinitely by the Sierra Leone Football Association for alleged match-fixing just days after completing an unsuccessful trial spell with Swindon Town.
30 July 2014: Swindon Town are reported to be hoping to conclude a loan deal for Southampton defender Jordan Turnbull.

August
7 August 2014: Nathan Thompson is confirmed as the new club captain.
7 August 2014: BBC Wiltshire report that Swindon Town have had a bid rejected for Östersunds FK centre forward Modou Barrow.
11 August 2014: Reported interest from Coventry City for Town forward Michael Smith is debunked by Sky Blues manager Steven Pressley.
14 August 2014: Brad Smith returns to Liverpool for assessment after suffering a grade one medial strain.
18 August 2014: Mark Cooper concedes that Swindon Town may not be able to re-sign Southampton's Jack Stephens on loan after the young defender was named on the bench for the Saints' first Premier League game at Liverpool.
20 August 2014: Gillingham manager Peter Taylor bemoans Town manager Mark Coopers' celebrations after Stephen Bywater's late own goal in the 2–2 draw.
21 August 2014: Massimo Luongo and Brad Smith are called up by Australia for their friendlies against Belgium and Saudi Arabia.

September
4 September 2014: Massimo Luongo earns his second cap for Australia in the Socceroos' 2–0 loss to Belgium.
8 September 2014: Brad Smith makes his Australia debut while Massimo Luongo impresses in the Socceroos' 3–2 win over Saudi Arabia at Craven Cottage.
17 September 2014: The club dismiss tabloid links to ex-Manchester United and Burnley midfielder, Chris Eagles.
30 September 2014: Swindon Town are reported to be interested in Norwich City forward Jamar Loza as cover for the injured Jonathan Obika.

October

November

December
5 December 2014: Mark Cooper is named the Football League One Manager of the Month for November 2014.

January
31 January 2015: Massimo Luongo scores the first goal in Australia's triumph over South Korea in the final of the 2015 AFC Asian Cup.

February

March

April (2015)

May (2015)
7 May 2015: Swindon Town played Sheffield United in the first leg of their League One playoff semi-final. They won the game 2–1 with goals from Sam Ricketts and Nathan Byrne for Swindon Town.
11 May 2015: Swindon Town played Sheffield United in the second leg of their League One playoff semi-final. The game ended 5–5 with goals from Ben Gladwin (2), Michael Smith (2) and Jonathan Obika to progress to the playoff final 7-6 on aggregate. They will play Preston North End at Wembley Stadium on 24 May 2015 for promotion to the Football League Championship.

Sponsors 

On 22 May 2014, it was announced that South Korean multinational conglomerate company Samsung will no longer serve as Swindon Town's main shirt sponsors for the 2014/15 season, thus ending a three-year relationship with the firm. It was officially announced on 19 July 2014 that the Swindon based luxury holiday company, Imagine Cruising, would be the club's new home shirt sponsor for the 2014/15 season with local communications firm Excalibur acting as a secondary sponsor.  C&D Recruitment were later confirmed as the club's away shirt sponsor.

|}

Season squad

 (on loan from Liverpool)
 (on loan from Birmingham City)

 (on loan from Chelsea)
 (on loan from Derby County)
 (on loan from Norwich City)

 (on loan from Wolverhampton Wanderers)

Transfers

Trial players
{|
|-
|valign="top"|

Work experience

Managerial stats

Goalscorers

Clean sheets
Includes all competitive matches.

Disciplinary

Awards

Overall summary

Summary

Score overview

League table

Result summary

League One 

The fixture list for the 2014/15 campaign will be announced on 18 June 2014. It was confirmed that Swindon Town would start their 2014/15 campaign with a home fixture against Scunthorpe United.

August

September

October

November

December

January

February

March

April

May

League One play-offs

Semi-final

Final

The FA Cup

FA Cup results

The draw for the first round of the FA Cup was made on 27 October 2014.

The League Cup 

The draw for the First Round of the League Cup is to be made on 17 June 2014. It was announced that Swindon Town's First Round opponents would be Football Conference champions, Luton Town.

League Cup results

The Football League Trophy

Football League Trophy results

Pre-season 

The first friendly confirmed by the club was a home fixture against Premier League side, Southampton. However, Non-League sides Yate Town and Swindon Supermarine confirmed friendlies on their respective websites some weeks beforehand. A friendly was announced by Charlton Athletic but it was later cancelled.

References 

Swindon Town F.C. seasons
Swindon Town F.C.